Strawberry Line may refer to one of two places in the United Kingdom.

 The Strawberry Line railway walk. A footpath between Yatton and Winscombe following the old Cheddar Valley line
 The Strawberry Line miniature railway. A 5" gauge railway in the south of England.